Lars Eugen Hedwall (10 February 1897 – 29 July 1969) was a Swedish male runner who competed in the 1920 Summer Olympics. He finished seventh in the 3000 metre steeplechase and 24th in the individual cross country event. Although he was a member of the bronze medal winning Swedish cross country team, he did not receive a medal because only three best runners from each team were honored, while Hedwall was fifth.

References

1897 births
1969 deaths
Swedish male middle-distance runners
Olympic athletes of Sweden
Athletes (track and field) at the 1920 Summer Olympics
Swedish male steeplechase runners
Olympic cross country runners